Hokushin Ittō-ryū Hyōhō (北辰一刀流兵法) is a koryū (古流) that was founded in the late Edo period (1820s) by Chiba Shusaku Narimasa (千葉周作成政, 1794–1856). He was one of the last masters who was called a Kensei (sword saint).

Curriculum and Characteristics 

The curriculum of the ryūha contains mainly kenjutsu, iaijutsu and naginatajutsu, but the main weapons used are the long and short swords (katana and wakizashi).

Hokushin Ittō-ryū is a very intense duelling style which focuses on simple and fast techniques where no unnecessary movements are made. Controlling the enemy's centre line with the kiri-otoshi and dominating him with extremely fast tsuki-waza are the signature techniques of this ryūha. The principles of this style are that a perfect technique should contain defence and offence in one action.

Characteristic of the training is the use of onigote (heavily padded gloves) like in its ancestor styles Ono-ha Ittō-ryū and Nakanishi-ha Ittō-ryū which are used in several  (two person practice). This kind of training became more and more obsolete towards the end of the Edo-period with the spread of gekiken and the use of bogu and shinai.

The  is practiced using  (real swords with the sharp edge removed).

Hokushin Ittō-ryū also has Iaijutsu (Hokushin-ryū iai 北辰流居合). Now only some teachers know the techniques. Some techniques are depicted in old papers in the Kumamoto prefectural library (熊本県立図書館). It is a very simple , with 4 kata for sitting (corresponding to an enemy in front or behind), 4 kata for standing (corresponding to an enemy in front or behind), and 3 kata for hiki-waza (stepping backwards).

In Noda-Konishi's line, some kata have been added to Gogyō-no-kata (五行の形) and Battōjutsu (抜刀術).

Gogyō-no-kata has five  and three  which looks very similar to Koshi-Gogyō-no-kata (高師五行の形), which was Nakanishi-ha's kata revised by Takano Sasaburo (高野佐三郎) in 1908.

In 1932, Noda Wasaburo (野田和三郎) and Kobayashi Sadayuki (小林定之) demonstrated seven  and three  as Hokushin Ittō-ryū at Kyoto-Butokuden (京都武徳殿) (Refer to The program of 36th Butoku-sai great demonstration festival No.3 第三十六回武徳祭大演武會演武番組 其三).

Battōjutsu is not the Chiba family's Hokushin-ryū iai. The katas' names and techniques were introduced by Konishi Shigejiro (refer to Kendo Nippon, Mar. 1978 12–15), but the techniques and the katas' names differ from the Edo-Meiji period's densho texts. For example, Unryū-ken (雲龍剣), Hien-gaeshi (飛燕返) and Taihō-ken (大鵬剣).

Famous swordsmen 

Towards the end of the Bakumatsu period (1853-1867), the Hokushin Ittō-ryū was one of the three biggest and most famous ryūha all over Japan. 
Swordsmen of the Hokushin Ittō-ryū had a strong influence on the development of modern kendō in the late 19th century.
Also many famous and politically influential people were masters of this swordsmanship school.

Some of the most prominent figures are:

 Sakamoto Ryōma 坂本龍馬 (Famous revolutionary)
 Itō Kashitarō 伊藤甲子太郎 (Military advisor of the Shinsengumi) 
 Yamaoka Tesshū 山岡鉄舟 (Founder of the Ittō Shōden Mutō-ryū)
 Chiba Sana 千葉さな (Daughter of the 1st Chiba-Dōjō headmaster, also known as Chiba Sanako)
 Yamanami Keisuke山南敬介 (Vice commander of the Shinsengumi) 
 Tōdō Heisuke 藤堂平助 (Captain of the 8th squad of the Shinsengumi) 
 Kiyokawa Hachirō 清河八郎 (Founder of the Kiyokawa-school and Roshigumi)
 Yoshimura Kanichirō 吉村貫一郎 (Kenjutsu instructor of the Shinsengumi)
 Negishi Shorei 根岸松齢 (13th Sōke of the Annaka-han Araki-ryū and founder of the Negishi-ryū (Shurikenjutsu))
 Okada Sadagoro 岡田定五郎 (Famous swordsman of the Bakumatsu and Meiji period and 14th Sōke of the Annaka-han Araki-ryū)
 Naitō Takaharu 内藤高治 (A key developer of modern kendo)
 Takano Sasaburo 高野佐三郎 (A key developer of modern kendo)
 Monna Tadashi 門奈正 (A key developer of modern kendo)
 Mochida Moriji 持田盛二 (One of the most famous kendoka of the 20th century)
 Hoshino Amachi 星野天知 (Novelist, scientist, also Yagyū Shingan-ryū shihan)
 Sakurada Sakuramaro 櫻田櫻麿 (Master of Ono-ha Ittō-ryū, Hokushin Ittō-ryū, founder of Chūka-Ittō-ryū 中和一刀流)
 Suzuki Naonoshin 鈴木直之進 (Master of Yagyū Shingan-ryū, Ono-ha Ittō-ryū, Hokushin Ittō-ryū, and founder of Tenshin Ittō-ryū 天辰一刀流)

Ranking System 
The Hokushin Ittō-ryū has three teaching steps:

Shoden 初伝 (entry-transmission)
Chūden 中伝 (middle-transmission)
Okuden 奥伝 (inner-transmission)

Like many other koryū, Hokushin Ittō-ryū traditionally awards makimono-scrolls and/or inka-jō. There is no modern dan/kyū system in this school. 
The traditional five scrolls of Hokushin Ittō-ryū are:
Kirigami 剪紙
Hatsumokuroku 初目録
Kajōmokuroku / Seigandenju 箇条目録 / 星眼伝授
Chūmokuroku / Menkyo 中目録 / 免許 (full transmission of all techniques)
Daimokuroku / Menkyo-Kaiden 大目録 / 免許皆伝 (full transmission of the ryūha)

The so-called Naginata Mokuroku 長刀目録 also exists and is normally issued together with the Menkyo (Chūmokuroku). It certifies the mastery of all naginatajutsu techniques of the school.
Some names of the naginata kata are the same as those in the Hokushin Musō-ryū (北辰夢想流) densho (伝書).

In Tottori-han (鳥取藩), the Sadakichi line (定吉系) also awards Hon-mokuroku (本目録) like Ono-ha Ittō-ryū (the Sadakichi line's densho collected in Tottori prefectural museum (鳥取県立博物館) ). However, the Shusaku line (周作系) has only three Mokuroku, which are the Hatsu-Mokuroku (初目録), the Chu-Mokuroku-Menkyo (中目録免許) and the Dai-Mokuroku-Kaiden (大目録皆伝), written in "Kenpo Hiketsu" by Chiba Shusaku (千葉周作「剣法秘訣」).

During the Bakumatsu period, Hokushin Ittō-ryū was very popular due to the decreased number of mokuroku to 3 from 8, the Ono-ha Ittō-ryū's pass number.
In all Bujutsu ryūha, students have to pay money or send gifts to the instructor when issued with a mokuroku, therefore Hokushin Ittō-ryū was a more accessible ryūha for poor farmers and bushi. Also, a part of the students joined in the coup of the Edo Bakufu with other new ryūha students, such as those from Shinto Munen-ryū).

Lineage

Old main lines 

The two main lines were that of the founder Chiba Shusaku Narimasa at the Edo-Genbukan, and that of the founder's younger brother Chiba Sadakichi Masamichi at the Chiba-Dōjō.
Towards the end of the Meiji period, the line of the Edo-Genbukan became extinct. The Chiba-Dōjō line, unlike that of the Edo-Genbukan has survived until today. Currently the Hokushin Ittō-ryū Hyōhō is headed by Ōtsuka Ryūnosuke Masatomo, the 7th Soke.

Edo-Genbukan (extinct)

1st Chiba Shūsaku Narimasa 千葉周作成政
2nd Chiba Kisotarō Takatane 千葉寄蘇太郎高胤
3rd Chiba Eijirō Nariyuki 千葉栄二郎成之(he led the Edo-Genbukan until his death in 1862)	           
4th Chiba Michisaburō Mitsutane 千葉道三郎光胤
5th Chiba Shūnosuke Koretane 千葉周之助之胤

Chiba Shūnosuke Koretane restored the Edo-Genbukan in 1883 with the help of Inoue Hachirō and Yamaoka Tesshū. The Edo-Genbukan was closed between the 20th – 30th year of the Meiji-period. The exact date is unknown.

Chiba family Seiden (revived, Ryūgasaki 龍ヶ崎)

1st Chiba Shūsaku Narimasa 千葉周作成政
2nd Chiba Eijirō Nariyuki 千葉栄二郎成之(he led the Genbukan until his death in 1862)	           
3rd Chiba Michisaburō Mitsutane 千葉道三郎光胤
4th Chiba Einosuke 千葉英之助 (He did not practice Hokushin Ittō-ryū)
5th Chiba Masatane 千葉雅胤 (He did not practice Hokushin Ittō-ryū)
6th Chiba Yoshitane 千葉吉胤 (He did not practice Hokushin Ittō-ryū)
7th Shiina Kazue 椎名市衛 (He practiced Hokushin Ittō-ryū under Yajima Saburo 谷島三郎, who practiced under the Tobukan 3rd generation headmaster Kozawa Toyokichi 小澤豊吉)

This Hokushin Ittō-ryū line ended with the 3rd generation headmaster, Chiba Michisaburo. However Shiina Kazue managed to find Chiba Michisaburo’s progeny, Chiba Yoshitane, who did not practice Hokushin Ittō-ryū. Shiina Kazue became Sōke in 2013.

Chiba-Dōjō (Revived, Ōtsuka-ha 大塚派)

 1st Chiba Sadakichi Masamichi 千葉定吉政道
 2nd Chiba Jūtarō Kazutane 千葉重太郎一胤
 3rd Chiba Tō-ichirō Kiyomitsu 千葉統一郎清光
 4th Chiba Tsukane 千葉束
 5th Chiba Hiroshi Masatane 千葉弘 (He did not practice Hokushin Ittō-ryū)
 6th Ōtsuka Yōichirō 大塚洋一郎 (He practiced Hokushin Ittō-ryū under Konishi Shigejiro (小西重治郎))
 7th Ōtsuka Ryūnosuke 大塚龍之介 (He practiced Hokushin Ittō-ryū under Konishi Shigejiro and Ōtsuka Yōichirō)

The Chiba-Dōjō of Chiba Sadakichi Masamichi (younger brother of school's founder) became one of the most famous Dōjō all over Japan after its founding in the late 1840s. The teaching-line of the Edo-Genbukan disappeared soon after the Dōjō was closed at the end of the Meiji period. The Chiba-Dōjō was also closed at the beginning of the Taisho period. The Chiba family, which did not practice the school but owned the family documents has survived until today. The 5th generation head of the family, Chiba Hiroshi, did not practice or train in the school, nor was there anyone actively practicing under him. Therefore he renounced his family's claims and documents to Ōtsuka Yōichirō Masanori, the 6th Sōke who trained under Konishi Shigejirō of the Noda-ha Hokushin Ittō-ryū. Ōtsuka recreated the Chiba-line in 2013, and was then succeeded by a German citizen named Markus Lösch, who later changed his name to Ōtsuka Ryūnosuke when he became Menkyo-Kaiden in 2014. He later was appointed the 7th Sōke in March 2016.

Regional Lines 

At the middle of the Meiji-period there were many side branches, founded by pupils of the two main lines.
One of the most famous was the Tobukan in Mito.
It was established by Kozawa Torakichi, a student of the Edo-Genbukan.
Kozawa Torakichi was also an instructor at the Kodokan (弘道館), the official clan school of the Mito-clan.
After the Meiji-restoration and the abolishment of the traditional clan system the Kodokan was closed, so in order to continue teaching, Kozawa Torakichi opened his own Dōjō, the Tobukan. There he taught Hokushin Ittō-ryū together with Shin Tamiya-ryū (新田宮流抜刀術) and Suifu-ryū (水府流剣術) (Torakichi's second son Kozawa Jiro Atsunobu (小澤二郎篤信) inherited Suifu-ryū kenjutsu from his own other Dōjō). This Hokushin Ittō-ryū line is also the line of the school which is a member of the Nihon Kobudo Kyokai. Up until today, the Kozawa family is still preserving the teachings of its first headmaster at the Tobukan in Mito.

Mito-Tobukan 水戸東武館
In the Tobukan there is no Hokushin Ittō-ryū "Sōke". Instead there exists a Hokushin Ittō-ryū "representative" (as described in the Nikon Kobudo kyokai homepage).

The family name "Kozawa" of the 3rd generation, Toyokichi, and the 4th generation, Takeshi are son-in-law taken into family with Ichiro's daughter (as described in the Tobukan homepage).

 1st Kozawa Torakichi Masakata 小澤寅吉政方
 2nd Kozawa Ichiro Hirotake 小澤一郎弘武
 3rd Kozawa Toyokichi 小澤豊吉, Moriyama Shigeo 森山繁雄, Sato Nobuo 佐藤信雄
 4th Kozawa Takeshi 小澤武, Kozawa Kiyoko 小澤喜代子
 5th Kozawa Satoshi 小澤智, Osono Toshitsugu 小薗壽嗣

Otaru-Genbukan 小樽玄武館 (Noda-ha)

(This dōjō is not to be mistaken for the Edo-Genbukan.)

Kobayashi Seijiro was granted the Inka-jo from Chiba Michisaburo, and opened the Shisei-kan dōjō in Tokyo. He did not have a son, so he adopted Katsuura Shiro, who was later granted a Hokushin Ittō-ryū menkyo. He then went to Otaru, Hokkaido for musha-shugyo. The master of Otaru Nanburo, Noda Wasaburo, approved of his kenjutsu and personality. His daughter Haru married Shiro, and Shiro was taken into family as Noda Shiro. In 1913, the Otaru Genbukan was constructed in Nanburo. Chiba Katsutaro (Michisaburo's second son) gave his permission to use the name Genbukan.

In 1933, 14 year-old Konishi Shigejiro became a disciple of Otaru Genbukan, becoming an assistant instructor in 1937. In 1938, Shigejiro joined the war. In 1944, Noda Shiro died. After the war in 1945, Shigejiro conceded the inheritance of the line to his senior Miura Yoshikatsu, but Shigejiro later inherited it from Yoshikatsu in turn.

In 1950, Shigejiro opened an outdoor dōjō in Zenpukuji temple park in Tokyo, and in the autumn constructed a proper dōjō, giving it the name Genbukan. Shigejiro died in 2009 at 90 years of age.

 1st Noda Shiro 野田四郎 (founder of the Otaru-Genbukan)
 2nd Kobayashi Yoshikatsu 小林義勝
 3rd Konishi (Ono) Shigejirô 小西(小野)重治郎 (moved the dōjō to Tokyo and renamed it Suginami-Genbukan)
 4th Konishi Shinen Kazuyuki 小西真円一之

The Chiba dōjō's 6th Sōke, Ōtsuka Yōichirō, was a student of Konishi Shigejiro.

Hokushin Ittoryu Koto-kan 北辰一刀流　虎韜館 

The student of Konishi Shigejiro, Tukada Yoshikazu, Takano sanetora 高野眞虎 (Hokushin Ittoryu Originator) teaches in this Dōjō Koto-kan in Nagano. 

they are training in gymnasiums and Monbu Gakko 文武学校. (This building is built in Bakumatsu period, the building construction was followed Kodo-kan 弘道館 in Mito 水戸.)

Sakurada Hokushin Ittō-ryū 櫻田北辰一刀流
Sakurada Sakuramaro 櫻田櫻麿 in Sendai-han is the instructor of the Hokushin Ittō-ryū in Edo period.
And he started "Chūka"-Ittō-ryū 中和一刀流 in Sendai.

In 20th century, Tsumura Keiji said that he has inherited the Sakurada Sakuramaro's Hokushin Ittō-ryū. 
And posted the inherit tree on his own web page. (Now, the web page is deleted.)

The inherit tree contains several strange points. In any case, he and his students are training .
They are now training in Shushin Budokai (修心武道会).

 1st Tsumura Keiji 津村恵治
 2nd Seki Nobuhide 関展秀

References

External links 

 Official website of the Hokushin Ittō-ryū Hyōhō (Ōtsuka-ha, Chiba-Dōjō / Honbu)
 (Official Nihon Kobudo Kyokai Entry)
 Official website of Hokushin Ittō-ryū in Tobukan
 Official website of the Noda-ha Hokushin Ittō-ryū (Otaru-Genbukan)
 Official website of the Hokushin Ittō-ryū Hyōhō (Ōtsuka-ha, Tōkyō-Shibu)
 Official Italian branch's website of the Hokushin Ittō-ryū Hyōhō
 Lineage of the Hokushin Ittō-ryū Chiba-Family (Japanese)

Japanese swordsmanship
Ko-ryū bujutsu
Japanese martial arts